The 2020 Galkayo bombing was a suicide bombing committed by Al-Shabaab in the city of Galkayo, Somalia. The Bombing killed 17 including four high ranking military commanders.

Bombing
On 18 December 2020, a suicide bomber entered Abdullahi Isse stadium in Galkayo, Somalia where prime minister Mohamed Hussein Roble was set to speak at along with several high ranking military commanders. The suicide bombing killed 17 and wounded at least 20.

Notable casualties 
 Gen. Abdiaziz Abdullahi Qooje - commander of Division 21 of the Somali National Army
 Col. Mukhtar Abdi Adan - regional commander of Danab Brigade, Galmudug Division, 10th Brigade
 Maj. Dhamme Abdirahman Mire Ali - deputy commander of Danab Brigade, Galmudug Division, 10th Brigade
 Mohamud Yasin Ahmed - former mayor of Galkayo, Puntland Division

References

2020 in Puntland
2020 murders in Somalia
21st-century mass murder in Somalia 
Al-Shabaab (militant group) attacks
December 2020 crimes in Africa
2020 bombing
Islamic terrorist incidents in 2020
Mass murder in 2020
Somali Civil War (2009–present)
Suicide bombings in 2020
Suicide bombings in Somalia
Terrorist incidents in Somalia in 2020